Broadland District Council in Norfolk, England is elected every four years. Up until 2004 one third of the Council was elected each year, followed by one year without election. Since the last boundary changes in 2004, 47 councillors have been elected from 27 wards.

Political control
Since the first election to the council in 1973 political control of the council has been held by the following parties:

Leadership
The leaders of the council since  have been:

Council elections
1973 Broadland District Council election
1976 Broadland District Council election
1979 Broadland District Council election (New ward boundaries)
1980 Broadland District Council election
1982 Broadland District Council election
1983 Broadland District Council election
1984 Broadland District Council election
1986 Broadland District Council election
1987 Broadland District Council election
1988 Broadland District Council election
1990 Broadland District Council election
1991 Broadland District Council election
1992 Broadland District Council election
1994 Broadland District Council election
1995 Broadland District Council election
1996 Broadland District Council election
1998 Broadland District Council election
1999 Broadland District Council election
2000 Broadland District Council election
2002 Broadland District Council election
2003 Broadland District Council election
2004 Broadland District Council election (New ward boundaries reduced the number of seats by 2)
2007 Broadland District Council election
2011 Broadland District Council election
2015 Broadland District Council election
2019 Broadland District Council election

By-election results

1997-2001

2001-2011

References

By-election results

External links
Broadland Council

 
Broadland
Council elections in Norfolk
District council elections in England